Saturday Night at the Village Vanguard is a live album by saxophonist Art Pepper, recorded at the Village Vanguard in 1977 and released on the Contemporary label.

Reception

The AllMusic review by Scott Yanow states: "The altoist was entering his peak period".

Track listing
All compositions by Art Pepper except as indicated
 "You Go to My Head" (J. Fred Coots, Haven Gillespie) - 11:35 	
 "The Trip" - 12:25 	
 "Cherokee" (Ray Noble) - 15:57 	
 "For Freddie" - 10:35 Bonus track on CD reissue

Personnel
Art Pepper - alto saxophone, (tenor saxophone on Cherokee)
George Cables - piano
George Mraz - bass
Elvin Jones - drums

References

Contemporary Records live albums
Art Pepper live albums
1979 live albums
Albums recorded at the Village Vanguard